Elasmostethus cruciatus, known generally as the red-cross shield bug or redcrossed stink bug, is a species of shield bug in the family Acanthosomatidae. It is found in North America.

References

External links

 

Acanthosomatidae
Articles created by Qbugbot
Insects described in 1831